The 2004–05 Buffalo Sabres season was to be the 35th for the National Hockey League franchise that was established on May 22, 1970.  The season was cancelled as the 2004–05 NHL lockout could not be resolved in time to save the season.

Offseason

Schedule
The Sabres preseason and regular season schedules were announced on July 12 and July 14, 2004, respectively.

|-
| 1 || September 24 || Columbus Blue Jackets
|-
| 2 || September 25 || Minnesota Wild
|-
| 3 || September 28 || @ Toronto Maple Leafs
|-
| 4 || October 2 || @ Montreal Canadiens
|-
| 5 || October 3 || @ Minnesota Wild
|-
| 6 || October 6 || Montreal Canadiens
|-
| 7 || October 8 || Toronto Maple Leafs
|-
| 8 || October 10 || @ Tampa Bay Lightning
|-

|-
| 1 || October 15 || @ Columbus Blue Jackets
|-
| 2 || October 16 || New Jersey Devils
|-
| 3 || October 18 || Tampa Bay Lightning
|-
| 4 || October 21 || @ Atlanta Thrashers
|-
| 5 || October 22 || @ Dallas Stars
|-
| 6 || October 24 || @ Phoenix Coyotes
|-
| 7 || October 26 || @ St. Louis Blues
|-
| 8 || October 28 || San Jose Sharks
|-
| 9 || October 30 || Pittsburgh Penguins
|-
| 10 || November 4 || @ Boston Bruins
|-
| 11 || November 5 || Philadelphia Flyers
|-
| 12 || November 12 || Edmonton Oilers
|-
| 13 || November 13 || @ New York Rangers
|-
| 14 || November 15 || Toronto Maple Leafs
|-
| 15 || November 17 || Carolina Hurricanes
|-
| 16 || November 19 || New York Rangers
|-
| 17 || November 20 || @ Carolina Hurricanes
|-
| 18 || November 24 || Boston Bruins
|-
| 19 || November 26 || Montreal Canadiens
|-
| 20 || November 27 || @ Toronto Maple Leafs
|-
| 21 || December 1 || Minnesota Wild
|-
| 22 || December 3 || New York Islanders
|-
| 23 || December 4 || @ Philadelphia Flyers
|-
| 24 || December 7 || @ New Jersey Devils
|-
| 25 || December 9 || Boston Bruins
|-
| 26 || December 11 || @ Boston Bruins
|-
| 27 || December 13 || Toronto Maple Leafs
|-
| 28 || December 15 || @ Florida Panthers
|-
| 29 || December 17 || @ Tampa Bay Lightning
|-
| 30 || December 19 || Florida Panthers
|-
| 31 || December 21 || @ Montreal Canadiens
|-
| 32 || December 22 || Montreal Canadiens
|-
| 33 || December 26 || New York Rangers
|-
| 34 || December 28 || @ Pittsburgh Penguins
|-
| 35 || December 29 || @ Chicago Blackhawks
|-
| 36 || January 1 || Vancouver Canucks
|-
| 37 || January 3 || Chicago Blackhawks
|-
| 38 || January 5 || Ottawa Senators
|-
| 39 || January 8 || @ New York Islanders
|-
| 40 || January 9 || @ Washington Capitals
|-
| 41 || January 11 || Atlanta Thrashers
|-
| 42 || January 13 || Carolina Hurricanes
|-
| 43 || January 15 || @ Philadelphia Flyers
|-
| 44 || January 17 || @ Tampa Bay Lightning
|-
| 45 || January 19 || @ Florida Panthers
|-
| 46 || January 21 || @ Atlanta Thrashers
|-
| 47 || January 22 || @ Ottawa Senators
|-
| 48 || January 25 || St. Louis Blues
|-
| 49 || January 27 || New York Islanders
|-
| 50 || January 29 || @ New York Islanders
|-
| 51 || January 30 || @ Boston Bruins
|-
| 52 || February 1 || Toronto Maple Leafs
|-
| 53 || February 3 || New Jersey Devils
|-
| 54 || February 5 || Pittsburgh Penguins
|-
| 55 || February 8 || Ottawa Senators
|-
| 56 || February 10 || Washington Capitals
|-
| 57 || February 15 || @ Detroit Red Wings
|-
| 58 || February 18 || @ Toronto Maple Leafs
|-
| 59 || February 20 || Atlanta Thrashers
|-
| 60 || February 22 || Washington Capitals
|-
| 61 || February 25 || Tampa Bay Lightning
|-
| 62 || February 26 || @ Montreal Canadiens
|-
| 63 || March 1 || @ Los Angeles Kings
|-
| 64 || March 3 || @ San Jose Sharks
|-
| 65 || March 4 || @ Anaheim Mighty Ducks
|-
| 66 || March 9 || Boston Bruins
|-
| 67 || March 11 || Ottawa Senators
|-
| 68 || March 12 || @ Montreal Canadiens
|-
| 69 || March 15 || Colorado Avalanche
|-
| 70 || March 18 || @ New York Rangers
|-
| 71 || March 19 || Nashville Predators
|-
| 72 || March 21 || @ New Jersey Devils
|-
| 73 || March 23 || Philadelphia Flyers
|-
| 74 || March 26 || @ Ottawa Senators
|-
| 75 || March 27 || Calgary Flames
|-
| 76 || March 29 || @ Carolina Hurricanes
|-
| 77 || March 31 || @ Pittsburgh Penguins
|-
| 78 || April 1 || @ Ottawa Senators
|-
| 79 || April 3 || Florida Panthers
|-
| 80 || April 6 || @ Washington Capitals
|-
| 81 || April 8 || Montreal Canadiens
|-
| 82 || April 9 || @ Toronto Maple Leafs
|-

Transactions
The Sabres were involved in the following transactions from June 8, 2004, the day after the deciding game of the 2004 Stanley Cup Finals, through February 16, 2005, the day the  season was officially cancelled.

Trades
The Sabres did not make any trades.

Players acquired

Players lost

Signings

Draft picks
Buffalo's picks at the 2004 NHL Entry Draft, which was held at the RBC Center in Raleigh, North Carolina on June 26–27, 2004.

Farm teams
The Sabres AHL affiliate Rochester Americans played with a roster that included many future Sabres. Thomas Vanek, Derek Roy, Ryan Miller and Jason Pominville among others, played the season in Rochester. HSBC Arena (now the KeyBank Center) hosted a pair of Rochester games experimenting with blue ice to see if blue would make the television appearance better than white. The blue ice experiment was ultimately not accepted in post-lockout rule changes.

Notes

References

Buff
Buff
Buffalo Sabres seasons
Buffalo
Buffalo